Woodgate Beach is a coastal town in the locality of Woodgate in Bundaberg Region, Queensland, Australia.

History 
The town's name was changed from Woodgate to Woodgate Beach on 22 August 2003.

The Woodgate Beach public library opened in 1993 with a minor refurbishment in 2009.

Facilities 
The Bundaberg Regional Council operates a public library in the Community Centre at 1 Kangaroo Court.

References

External links 
 
 

Towns in Queensland
Bundaberg Region
Coastline of Queensland